The 2010 Saskatchewan Huskies football team represented the University of Saskatchewan in the 2010 CIS university football season. They played their home games at Griffiths Stadium in Saskatoon, Saskatchewan. The team had lost to the Calgary Dinos in the 2009 Canada West Final, in the previous season.

Rankings

RV - Received Votes

Preseason

Schedule

The schedule is as follows:

Playoffs

Radio
All Huskies football games will be carried on CK750. The radio announcers are Darryl Skender and Kelly Bowers.

Roster

Game notes

vs. Western Ontario

vs. Calgary

vs. UBC

vs. Regina

vs. Alberta

vs. Manitoba

vs. Calgary

vs. UBC

vs. Regina

vs. Alberta

Awards

2011 CFL Draft Choices

2011 East West Bowl Selections

References

Saskatchewan Huskies
Saskatchewan Huskies football seasons